Andrés Martínez may refer to:

 Andrés Martínez Trueba (1884–1959), president of Uruguay, 1951–1955
 Andrés Ciro Martínez (born 1968), Argentine singer and musician
 Andrés Martínez (athlete), Paralympic athlete from Spain
 Andrés Martínez (footballer) (born 1972), former Uruguayan football player
 Andrés Martinez (athlete), Spanish sprinter
 Andrés Martinez (editor) (born 1966), Mexican-born American journalist, formerly at the Los Angeles Times
 Andrés Martínez (weightlifter) (born 1944), Cuban Olympic weightlifter